Arcadius Avellanus, born Mogyoróssy Arkád (6 February 1851 – 16 June 1935), was a Hungarian American scholar of Latin and a proponent of Living Latin.

Mogyoróssy was born in Esztergom. Few details of his life in Europe are known with certainty; he is said to have spoken Latin as a child before he was fluent in Hungarian. He studied extensively in Europe and used Latin whenever possible, in preference to any other language.  He emigrated to the United States in 1878, where he adopted a Latin translation of his original name; the common hazel is "mogyoró" in Hungarian and Corylus avellana in Latin.

Avellanus edited the Praeco Latinus ("Latin Herald") in Philadelphia from 1894 to 1902. He later taught at a number of second- and third-level institutions, becoming a professor at St. John's College in Brooklyn. He founded a Latin-speaking club known as the Societas Gentium Latina, Inc. On his eightieth birthday the club held a dinner in his honor in one of the Hungarian restaurants where he gathered nightly with friends with whom he could converse in Latin.

Avellanus advocated Latin as an international auxiliary language, deriding Esperanto as "Desperanto".

Publications
His "Tusculum" system for learning spoken Latin was described in several editions:
 Tusculum; folia latina menstrua ad disciplinam linguae latinae viva voce tradendam. (published serially in Philadelphia, 1893–6)
 Palaestra, being the primer of the Tusculan system of learning, and of teaching Latin to speak; for class use and for self-instruction: (3rd edition, Philadelphia, 1908)
 Arena palaestrarum (pars prior 1893; pars secunda 1900)
 Fabulae tusculanae, ad suppeditandam praeceptoribus studiosisque materiam latinum sermonem vivae vocis adminiculo docendi et discendi. (first edition New York 1913; second edition Brooklyn 1928), a student reader

He also edited, with commentary, an edition of Corderius' Colloquia.

He made translations into Latin of popular fiction, published by Ezra Parmalee Prentice as Mount Hope Classics. Charles H. Forbes of Phillips Academy criticized the language used as not faithful to that of the classical authors. However, Avellanus was a major proponent of breaking free of classical Latin models. In response, he defended his post-classical Latinity and criticized the rationale of classicists, many of whom he despised:

Monebat Dr. Avellanus unum ex eiusmodi critica (sic) constare, praeceptores nostros nunquam antea librum Latinum vidisse praeter textus sibi ad tractandum praepositos. Nam si omnis liber qui a stylo Ciceronis differret, reiciendus esset, praeter quattuor primores auctores Romanos tota litteratura Latina binum millium annorum flammis esset abolenda: proinde patres Ecclesiae, Scholastici, Biblia Latina, omnia Chronica Monastica, opera Erasmi, Lutheri, Calvini, Philippi Melanchthonis, Capnionis, Hugonis Grotii, Baconum, omnium philologorum, physicorum, astronomorum, uno verbo, omnia opera Latina, omnes bibliothecae esset comburenda. Nemo nisi insaniat, critico eiusmodi adstipulabitur.

Translation:
Dr. Avellanus was warning that one thing was clear from this sort of criticism: that our teachers had never before seen a book in Latin except for those texts that they had been assigned to discuss. For if every book must be rejected that differs from the style of Cicero, the entire body of Latin literature of the last two thousand years, except for the first four Roman authors, must be tossed into the fire; moreover, those Church Fathers, Scholastics, the Latin Bible, all Monk Chronicles, the works of Erasmus, Luther, Calvin, Philipp Melanchthon, Capnion, Hugo Grotius, Bacon, the works of all philologists, physicists, astronomers, in one word, the whole body of Latin literature--all libraries--must be burned. Nobody, unless he's insane, will support this kind of critic.

References

External links

 
 Short biography and index of works (in Latin)
 E-book of Mysterium Arcae Boulé at Gutenberg.org
 E-book of Pericla Navarchi Magonis at Gutenberg.org
 Praeco Latinus, Vol. 2 et 3 (1895-1897) at HathiTrust
 Praeco Latinus, Vol. 5-8 (1898-1902) at HathiTrust

Translators to Latin
Austro-Hungarian emigrants to the United States
1851 births
1935 deaths
People from Esztergom
People from the Kingdom of Hungary
Writers from New York City
19th-century translators
20th-century translators
19th-century Latin-language writers
20th-century Latin-language writers
English–Latin translators